Sinai Hospital is an American private hospital based in Baltimore, Maryland, that was founded in 1866 as the Hebrew Hospital and Asylum. It is now a Jewish-sponsored teaching hospital that provides care for patients in the greater Baltimore City, Baltimore County and surrounding communities.  The implantable cardioverter-defibrillator (ICD) was invented here by the team of Dr. Michel Mirowski, Dr. Morton Mower, M. Stephen Heilman, and Alois Langer who are all in the National Inventors Hall of Fame for their achievement.

Since 1998, Sinai Hospital has been a part of the LifeBridge Health system, which also runs Northwest Hospital in Randallstown, Carroll Hospital in Westminster, Levindale Hebrew Geriatric Center and Nursing Home (which is across the street from Sinai), Rubin Institute for Advanced Orthopedics, several medical office buildings in the Baltimore area, and a health and fitness club called LifeBridge Health & Fitness, located in Pikesville, Maryland.

Sinai Hospital is located in Northwest Baltimore along Belvedere Avenue, near the intersection of Northern Parkway and Greenspring Avenue, and about a block away from Pimlico Race Course. The entrance to the emergency department known as ER-7 is accessible from Greenspring Avenue. The hospital itself is also surrounded by Cylburn and Lanier Avenues.

The hospital is very close to exit 10 off Interstate 83.

Several public bus lines operated by the Maryland Transit Administration serve the hospital, including Routes 1, 27, 44, and 91.

Specialties 
The specialty areas at Sinai include:
 Alvin & Lois Lapidus Cancer Institute
 Bariatric Surgery Program at Sinai
 Sandra and Malcolm Berman Brain & Spine Institute
 Adult Hydrocephalus Center
 Spine Center at Sinai
 Stroke Center at Sinai
 CyberKnife® Center
 ER-7 Emergency Center
 Cardiovascular Institute
 Herman and Walter Samuelson Children's Hospital at Sinai
 Krieger Eye Institute
 Rehabilitation Center
 Rubin Institute for Advanced Orthopedics
 International Center for Limb Lengthening
 Center for Joint Preservation and Replacement
 Sinai Center for Thrombosis Research
 Sleep Center at Sinai

Famous patients
Former Baltimore Orioles star pitcher Dave McNally was admitted to the hospital in late June 1975 with a case of chronic hiccups that had plagued him for nine days.

Notes 

Hospitals in Baltimore
Northern Baltimore
Hospitals established in 1866